Ralph H. Demmler (August 22, 1904 December 23, 1995) was an American lawyer specializing in corporate banking law and chairman of the U.S. Securities and Exchange Commission from June 1953 to May 1955.

Early life and education

He graduated from Allegheny College, where he was a member of the Phi Beta Kappa Society.   Demmler earned his law degree at the University of Pittsburgh.

Career
He began his law practice in Pittsburgh in 1928.

In 1943, Demmler joined the law firm Reed Smith Shaw & McClay and was elected a partner in 1948.

A member of the Republican Party, he served as chairman of the U.S. Securities and Exchange Commission (SEC) between June 1953 and 1955.  Demmler had been appointed a member of the commission just earlier.

From 1969 until 1980, he was an adviser on an American Law Institute project to codify federal securities laws.

In 1972, the SEC appointed Demmler to its Special Committee on Enforcement Policy.

Corporate directorships
During his career, he served as a member of the board of various corporations, including Duquesne Light, Sharon Steel and Hammermill Paper.

Personal life
Demmler died, age 91, in Pittsburgh, Pennsylvania.  At his death, he was survived by Catherine, his wife of 66 years.   Demmler was also survived by a son John H. Demmler and three grandchildren.

See also

 Attorneys in the United States
 List of Allegheny College alumni
 List of University of Pittsburgh people
 List of people from the Pittsburgh metropolitan area

References

1904 births
1995 deaths
20th-century American businesspeople
Allegheny College alumni
American corporate directors
Businesspeople from Pennsylvania
Eisenhower administration personnel
Members of the U.S. Securities and Exchange Commission
Pennsylvania lawyers
Pennsylvania Republicans
Politicians from Pittsburgh
University of Pittsburgh School of Law alumni